Kensington Intermediate Senior High School, is a Canadian secondary school in Kensington, Prince Edward Island.

Today it hosts grades 7 through 12, dividing the junior students into grades 7-9 and the senior students into grades 10–12, and has both an English program and late French Immersion program. The KISH school mascot is a torch, and the school motto is "Stamus Pro Veritate". KISH contains an industrial arts room, home economics room, library, gymnasium, 3 computer labs, cafeteria, and a stage. On school property there are also three tennis courts, a softball diamond, 2 soccer / rugby fields and a sports track. There are many extracurricular activities offered to students, such as Student Council, Band, Drama, Peer Tutoring, Student Police, and a wide range of sports such as volleyball, rugby, soccer, basketball, badminton, cross country and track and field. A very successful Canadian Travel and Tourism Diploma and Agriculture Certificate program are offered to senior high students as an extra-curricular program with curriculum links to a number of courses. KISH also has an annual show called the Green and White Revue, which features talent from the student body.

In 2013, the school became a focus of media attention after the principal at the time pleaded guilty to luring an underage student at the school. He was sentenced to three months in jail.

Notable people
Colin MacKenzie, former national curler.

See also
List of schools in Prince Edward Island
List of school districts in Prince Edward Island

References 

High schools in Prince Edward Island
Schools in Prince County, Prince Edward Island
Educational institutions established in 1955
1955 establishments in Prince Edward Island